Michael Carcone (born May 19, 1996) is a Canadian professional ice hockey forward currently playing for the Tucson Roadrunners of the American Hockey League (AHL) while under contract to the Arizona Coyotes of the National Hockey League (NHL).

Early life
Carcone was born on May 19, 1996, in Ajax, Ontario, Canada. He was born into an athletic family as both of his older brothers played ice hockey growing up. Although his father did not play sports, he owned multiple small glass companies while his grandfather owned a bar and a pizza restaurant.

Playing career
Growing up in Ajax, Carcone played for the Ajax-Pickering Raiders and The Hill Academy before joining the Stouffville Spirit in the Ontario Junior Hockey League (OJHL). Upon joining the Spirit, Carcone tallied 25 assists and 37 points through 49 games. As such, he was drafted in the 12th round, 196th overall, by the Sioux Falls Stampede in the 2014 United States Hockey League Draft. Despite this, Carcone returned to the Spirit where a scout from the Quebec Major Junior Hockey League (QMJHL) saw him play and convinced the Drummondville Voltigeurs to sign him to a major junior contract.

Upon joining the Voltigeurs, the coaching staff encouraged Carcone to improve his nutrition and work on getting stronger. He experienced numerous setbacks during his rookie season including a broken thumb and two concussions which caused him to miss six weeks. He also struggled with the language barrier as he did not speak French. Carcone subsequently finished the 2015–16 season with 12 goals and 29 assists for 41 points through 50 games. He improved offensively during his sophomore season with the team and increased his point total to 89 through 66 games. By November 2015, Carcone had scored  17 goals scored in 20 games to lead the league in scoring. His 89 points through 66 games tied him for the team lead in points while he finished first in goals and second in assists.

Professional
After remaining undrafted into the National Hockey League, Carcone signed a three-year, entry-level contract as an undrafted free agent with the Vancouver Canucks on July 16, 2016. Following the signing, Carcone joined the Canucks for their pre-season games before being assigned to their American Hockey League (AHL) affiliate, the Utica Comets, for the 2016–17 season. As one of the youngest players on the team,  Carcone made his professional debut on October 15. He finished his rookie season with five goals and 13 assists for 18 points through 61 games. Carcone returned to the Canucks organization for the 2017–18 season and attended their summer Development Camp.

Showing offensive capabilities, Carcone was a regular top six forward with the Comets, before he was traded during the 2018–19 season by the Canucks to the Toronto Maple Leafs in exchange for Josh Leivo on December 4, 2018. He was assigned directly join the Maple Leafs AHL affiliate, the Toronto Marlies, and posted a combined best of 44 points through 62 regular season games.

As a pending restricted free agent with the Maple Leafs in the following off-season, Carcone was traded for the second time in his career, joining the Ottawa Senators in a six-player trade on July 1, 2019. He was then signed to a two-year, two-way contract with the Senators on July 16, 2019.

In the 2019–20 season, after attending the Senators training camp, Carcone was assigned to the Belleville Senators of the AHL for the duration of the pandemic affected and shortened campaign posting 27 points in 59 games.

Approaching the pandemic delayed  season, Carcone was traded by the Senators to the Nashville Predators in exchange for Zach Magwood on December 21, 2020. With the Predators AHL affiliate, the Milwaukee Admirals, going on hiatus for the COVID affected season, Carcone was loaned for the season to fellow AHL team, the Tucson Roadrunners, the primary affiliate of the Arizona Coyotes, on February 5, 2021. Carcone led the Roadrunners with 15 goals, and contributed with 25 points, placing second on the team in 35 regular season games.

As a free agent from the Predators in the off-season, Carcone following his impressive tenure with the Roadrunners was signed to a two-year, two-way contract with the Arizona Coyotes on July 28, 2021. Carcone continued his tenure with the Roadrunners to begin the  season. Recording 12 points through 21 games, Carcone received his belated first recall to the NHL on December 28, 2021. He made his long-awaited NHL debut the same day, appearing on the fourth-line for the Coyotes in a 8–7 shootout defeat to the San Jose Sharks. He was then returned to the Roadrunners the following day.

Career statistics

References

External links
 

1996 births
Living people
Arizona Coyotes players
Belleville Senators players
Canadian ice hockey left wingers
Drummondville Voltigeurs players
Toronto Marlies players
Tucson Roadrunners players
Undrafted National Hockey League players
Utica Comets players